Ski country is the hilly, snowy portions of the boundary between the Niagara Frontier and the Southern Tier of the western part of New York.

Weather

The area is a largely hilly terrain, mostly downwind from Lake Erie, Lake Ontario and the Finger Lakes, along the Eastern Continental Divide between the Great Lakes, the Mississippi River and Susquehanna River watersheds. The result of this is that through orographic lift, a significant amount of lake effect snow falls there during the months of November, December and January.

The portion of ski country in Western New York is defined by a geologic formation known as the Chautauqua Ridge.

Ski destinations

As the name implies, the area is particularly popular with skiers, and there are several ski resorts that stretch from Pennsylvania into Central New York. The local ski resorts primarily offer alpine skiing while the numerous state parks use their hiking trails for cross-country skiing. Overall, the state of New York is the third-most popular skiing destination in the United States, behind Colorado and California, with neighboring Vermont a close fourth.

Resorts

Pennsylvania
Mount Pleasant of Edinboro - in Edinboro, Pennsylvania installed first chair lift in 2014 (also offers snow tubing)
Ski Denton/Denton Hill - in Coudersport, Pennsylvania (slightly outside the general definition of ski country, no longer in operation)

New York
 Big Basin Ski Area - in Red House, New York. Operated from 1951 until New York's ongoing eminent domain campaign forced most of Red House's private property to be vacated in 1972. 
 Bluemont Ski Area - Yorkshire, New York - closed in 1982
 Bova Ski Resort - in Red House, New York. Bova (named after the Beauvais family, who donated the land) was the site of a Great Depression-era public works project as part of Allegany State Park that would serve as the area's first ski destination. The Bova resort also included the region's only ski jumps. The ski jumps were damaged by a mudslide in 1979, and outdated and malfunctioning equipment led to the area's shutdown in 1980.
 Brantling Ski Slopes - in Sodus, New York
 Bristol Mountain - in South Bristol, New York (also offers Nordic skiing)
 Buffalo Ski Club - in Colden
 Cockaigne Ski Resort - in Cherry Creek (town), New York 
 Dry Hill Ski Area - in Watertown, New York
 Greek Peak - in Virgil, New York near the city of Cortland
 Grosstal/Wing Hollow Ski Area - in Allegany, New York (closed in early 80's)
 Holiday Valley - in Ellicottville (town), New York
 Holimont - in Ellicottville (also offers Nordic skiing)
 Poverty Hill/Concord Ski Club - in Ellicottville (closed 1991, land currently being repurposed)
 Kissing Bridge - in Glenwood, New York within the town of Colden
 Labrador Mountain - in Truxton, New York
 Mount Hermanns - in Olean, was the first commercial ski resort in the area and was established in the 1930s. It closed after several decades of operation due to competition from other, newer resorts in the area.
 Peek'n Peak - in Clymer, New York
 Snow Ridge Ski Resort - in Turin, New York
 Song Mountain Resort - in Tully, New York
 Swain Ski Resort - in Grove, New York 
 Toggenburg Mountain - in Fabius, New York

State parks
 Art Roscoe Ski Area at Allegany State Park in Red House, New York
 Keuka Lake State Park in Jerusalem, New York
 Letchworth State Park in Livingston County, New York
 Long Point State Park on Lake Chautauqua near Maple Springs, New York

See also
 List of ski areas and resorts in the United States
 Tug Hill Plateau

References

External links 
 New York State's ski portal

Regions of New York (state)